Fiumefreddo Bruzio is a town and comune in the province of Cosenza in the Calabria region of southern Italy. In 2005, Fiumefreddo Bruzio was awarded as one of the Borghi più belli d'italia (lit. one of the most beautiful villages in Italy).

Geography 
Fiumefreddo Bruzio is located on the coast of Tyrrhenian Sea, in the south of the province of Cosenza. It borders with Falconara Albanese (North) and Longobardi (South).

The town covers a surface of about 30 square kilometers (11.58 square miles). Even though the territory is predominantly hilly, it is characterized by a strong morphological variety, in fact, starting from sea level, the altitude grows up to 1541m on the peak of Monte Cocuzzo, the highest mountain on the coastline.

Main sights
Castello della Valle, founded in 1201. The entrance has a 16th-century Renaissance portal. It houses several works of local painter Salvatore Fiume. The castle was besieged in 1806-1807 by French troops, and nearly destroyed.
Mother Church, completed in 1674.
Palazzo Zupi (16th century)
 Palazzo Pignatelli
Church of San Rocco: the dome of this church was also painted by Salvatore FIume.
Church of Madonna del Carmelo
Fonte Laurato Abbey, located by the Fiume di mare river
Church of San Michele
Church of Santa Rita

Culture

Cuisine 
The local gastronomy, as like as the gastronomy of southern Italy, is characterized by simple dishes, but very spicy (hot peppers, parsley, basil, rosemary, garlic and onions are the most used spices). The dishes that better represent the cuisine of Fiumefreddo Bruzio are mainly two: the Filiciata  and the Frittata di patate.

The  Filiciata is a soft cheese, placed in layers of ferns. It was usually served during the Assunzione di Maria Vergine  holiday (Ferragosto) on August 15.

The Frittata di patate is a sort of fried omelette (even though it has the shape of a cake) made with potatoes from local farms. Even though it is called frittata (omelette), eggs are not needed to make it.

Among the other dishes of the province of Cosenza there are Cuddrurieddri, grispeddre, calabrian eggplant meatballs, stuffed alices ad many more.

References

Cities and towns in Calabria